Dangerous Charter is a 1962 seagoing adventure film shot in five days in 1958 on and around Santa Catalina Island. California, with no studio shooting. It was directed, co-produced and co-written by Robert Gottschalk as a showcase for his Panavision process. The film was distributed by Crown International Pictures.<ref>p. 10 Charter to Crown In'tl Box Office - Volume 80</ref>

Plot
Three struggling deep sea fisherman discover a luxury yacht named the Medusa that is abandoned, with the exception of a dead body found near the mast flying a flag of distress. The trio sail the Medusa into port where they hope to gain a large monetary reward under the law of salvage. The mystery deepens when it is discovered that there are no records on the Medusa and serial numbers have been removed from the ship making identification impossible.

The trio receive ownership of the Medusa'' and together with Marty's wife and Kick's daughter Sally hire it out as a bareboat charter to take a passenger to Baja California and the crew into danger.

Cast
 Chris Warfield as Marty
Sally Fraser as June
 Chick Chandler as Kick
 Dick Foote as Dick
 Peter Forster as Monet
 Wright King as Joe
 Carl Milletaire as Goon
 Steve Conte as Goon
 John Zaremba as FBI Special Agent
 John Pickard as Police Detective
 Alex Montoya as Harbor Master

Notes

External links 
 

1962 films
American black-and-white films
Crown International Pictures films
American independent films
1960s thriller films
1962 directorial debut films
1962 independent films
Seafaring films
1962 crime drama films
American crime drama films
1960s English-language films
1960s American films